The Paris Concert: Edition One is a live album by jazz pianist Bill Evans with Marc Johnson and Joe LaBarbera recorded in Paris, France in 1979 and originally released on the Elektra/Musician label. Additional recordings from this concert were released as The Paris Concert: Edition Two.

Reception
The Allmusic review by Scott Yanow awarded the album 4½ stars and states "Evans had one of the strongest trios of his career".

Track listing
 "I Do It for Your Love" (Paul Simon) - 6:18
 "Quiet Now" (Denny Zeitlin) - 5:55
 "Noelle's Theme" (Michel Legrand) - 4:20
 "My Romance" (Lorenz Hart, Richard Rodgers) - 9:15
 "I Loves You Porgy" (George Gershwin, Ira Gershwin, DuBose Heyward) - 7:02
 "Up With the Lark" (Jerome Kern, Leo Robin) - 6:41
 "All Mine (Minha)" (Ruy Guerra, Francis Hime) - 4:05
 "Beautiful Love" (Haven Gillespie, Wayne King, Egbert Van Alstyne, Victor Young) - 9:24

Personnel
Bill Evans - piano
Marc Johnson - bass
Joe LaBarbera - drums

References

Bill Evans live albums
1983 live albums
Elektra/Musician live albums